A Mannich base is a beta-amino-ketone, which is formed in the reaction of an amine, formaldehyde (or an aldehyde) and a carbon acid.  The Mannich base is an endproduct in the Mannich reaction, which is nucleophilic addition reaction of a non-enolizable aldehyde and any primary or secondary amine to produce resonance stabilized imine (iminium ion or imine salt). The addition of a carbanion from a CH acidic compound (any enolizable carbonyl compound, amide, carbamate, hydantoin or urea) to the imine gives the Mannich base.

Reactivity
With primary or secondary amines, Mannich bases react with additional aldehyde and carbon acid to larger adducts HN(CH2CH2COR)2 and N(CH2CH2COR)3. With multiple acidic hydrogen atoms on the carbon acid higher adducts are also possible. Ammonia can be split off in an elimination reaction  to form enals and enones.

References

Amines
Ketones